HSwMS Härnösand (K33) is the third ship of the s ordered by the Swedish Government and built by Kockums. The Härnösand is designed for mine countermeasures and anti-submarine warfare.

Design and description 

HSwMS Härnösand is the third ship of the s. It was built by Kockums at the Karlskrona naval base, and was the first of four vessels of the class which are designed for coastal warfare.

The hull of the vessel is made of carbon fiber reinforced plastic, a stealth technology, in order to make the vessel difficult to detect by other forces. A minimum of external equipment is stored outside of the vessel, with equipment such as liferafts being stored inside the hull. This hull also reduces the weight of the vessel by around half. It was intended to be radar silent until it moves within  of an enemy vessel, resulting in designer John Nillson saying of it, "Naval officers fall in love with [this] ship. It's not classically beautiful. In fact it looks like a lunchbox. But it has better maneuverability and can achieve that level of stealth."

Construction and career
Härnösand was launched 16 December 2004 and named by crown princess Victoria. She was commissioned on 16 December 2009.

References

External links

 BBC article
 FMV - Official homepage
 Kockums - Official homepage
 Swedish navy page on the Visby trials 

Corvettes of Sweden
Visby-class corvettes
2004 ships
Ships built in Malmö